Avanti Popolo can refer to:

 Bandiera Rossa, often also called Avanti Popolo
 Avanti Popolo (1986 film), a 1986 Israeli film
 Avanti Popolo (2012 film), a 2012 Brazilian film